A presidential train is an official train used by a country's president. They include:

 North Korean leaders' trains
 Tito's Blue Train (Yugoslavia)
 Presidential Railcars (The United States of America)

See also
 Luxury train
 Royal train

Trains
Train